Darleane Christian Hoffman (born November 8, 1926) is an American nuclear chemist who was among the researchers who confirmed the existence of Seaborgium, element 106. She is a faculty senior scientist in the Nuclear Science Division of Lawrence Berkeley National Laboratory and a professor in the graduate school at UC Berkeley. In acknowledgment of her many achievements, Discover Magazine recognized her in 2002 as one of the 50 most important women in science.

Early life and education
She was born as Darleane Christian on November 8, 1926 at home in the small town of Terril, Iowa, and is the daughter of Carl B. and Elverna Clute Christian. Her father was a mathematics teacher and superintendent of schools; her mother wrote and directed plays.

When she was a freshman in college at Iowa State College (now Iowa State University), she took a required chemistry course taught by Nellie May Naylor, and decided to pursue further study in that field. She received her B. S. (1948) and Ph. D. (1951) degrees in chemistry (nuclear) from Iowa State University.

Career
Darleane C. Hoffman was a chemist at Oak Ridge National Laboratory for a year and then joined her husband at the Los Alamos Scientific Laboratory where—after an extensive delay where she was denied access to the laboratory because the human resources department refused to believe that a woman could be a chemist—she began as a staff member in 1953. She became Division Leader of the Chemistry and Nuclear Chemistry Division (Isotope and Nuclear Chemistry Division) in 1979. She left Los Alamos in 1984 to accept appointments as tenured professor in the Department of Chemistry at UC Berkeley and Leader of the Heavy Element Nuclear & Radiochemistry Group at Lawrence Berkeley National Laboratory. Additionally, she helped found the Seaborg Institute for Transactinium Science at Lawrence Livermore National Laboratory in 1991 and became its first Director, serving until 1996 when she "retired" to become Senior Advisor and Charter Director.

Over her career, Hoffman studied the chemical and nuclear properties of transuranium elements and confirmed the existence of seaborgium.

Personal life
Right after finishing her doctoral work, Darleane Christian married Marvin M. Hoffman, a physicist. The Hoffmans had two children, Maureane Hoffman, M.D., Ph.D (Duke Medical School) and Dr. Daryl Hoffman (plastic surgeon), both born at Los Alamos.

Awards and memberships 
 2014 – Los Alamos Medal 
2000 – Priestley Medal, (only the second woman to win the Priestley, after Mary L. Good in 1997)
 1997 – National Medal of Science
 1990 – Garvan-Olin Medal
 1986 – Fellow of the American Physical Society
 1983 – ACS Award for Nuclear Chemistry, and she was the first woman to win the award.
 1978 – Guggenheim Fellowship

She is a member of the Norwegian Academy of Science and Letters.

References

External links
Darleane Hoffman, Harold Johnston to Receive National Medal of Science 

1926 births
Living people
Iowa State University alumni
21st-century American chemists
National Medal of Science laureates
UC Berkeley College of Chemistry faculty
Los Alamos National Laboratory personnel
Recipients of the Garvan–Olin Medal
Members of the Norwegian Academy of Science and Letters
American women chemists
Fellows of the American Physical Society
21st-century American women scientists